Bozcayurt, formerly known as Mandama (Greek: Μαντάμα), is a village in the Güzelyurt District, Aksaray Province, Turkey. Its population is 355 (2021).

References

Villages in Güzelyurt District, Aksaray